Ricky Anders Kling (born 2 June 1987 in Virserum, Sweden) is a Swedish speedway rider from Sweden.

Career
Kling made his British League debut in 2007 with Oxford, but when they closed mid-season, he then joined Lakeside Hammers. He stayed with the Hammers for the 2008 Elite League speedway season, which was the same year in which he won the Swedish U21 title.

Due to building constraints, he was forced to look elsewhere for the 2009 Elite League speedway season and joined the Eastbourne Eagles for two seasons.

He the joined the Belle Vue Aces for the 2011 season and then Poole Pirates for the 2012 season. His final season in Britain was during the 2013 Premier League speedway season when he rode for the Plymouth Devils.

In 2021, Kling made a one season comeback riding for Dackarna in the Elitserien.

Honours
Individual U-21 World Championship:
2006 - 9 place (6 points)
2007 - 14 place (3 points)
Team U-21 World Championship:
2006 - Silver medal (0 points)
2007 - 6 place (5 points in Semi-Final B)
2008 - Bronze medal (8 points)
Individual U-19 European Championship:
2005 - 5 place (10+X points)
2006 - 5 place (9 points)
European Pairs Championship:2007 - 10 place (11 points in Semi-Final A)''
Team Swedish Championship:
2004 - Bronze medal
2005 - Bronze medal
2006 - Bronze medal

See also
Sweden national speedway team

References

1987 births
Living people
Swedish speedway riders
Belle Vue Aces riders
Eastbourne Eagles riders
Lakeside Hammers riders
Oxford Cheetahs riders
Plymouth Devils riders
Poole Pirates riders